Transducin beta-like protein 3 is a protein that in humans is encoded by the TBL3 gene.

The protein encoded by this gene has sequence similarity with members of the WD40 repeat-containing protein family. The WD40 group is a large family of proteins, which appear to have a regulatory function. It is believed that the WD40 repeats mediate protein-protein interactions and members of the family are involved in signal transduction, RNA processing, gene regulation, vesicular trafficking, cytoskeletal assembly and may play a role in the control of cytotypic differentiation. This gene has multiple polyadenylation sites. It might have multiple alternatively spliced transcript variants but the variants have not been fully described yet.

References

Further reading